Alexander Jones (born 27 November 1964) is an English former professional footballer who played in the Football League as a central defender.

References

1964 births
Living people
Footballers from Blackburn
English footballers
Association football defenders
Oldham Athletic A.F.C. players
Stockport County F.C. players
Preston North End F.C. players
Carlisle United F.C. players
Rochdale A.F.C. players
Motherwell F.C. players
Halifax Town A.F.C. players
Stalybridge Celtic F.C. players
Southport F.C. players
Lancaster City F.C. players
English Football League players
Scottish Football League players